Helen Liebmann was a founding member (along with Simon Jeffes) of the avant garde music group Penguin Cafe Orchestra in 1973. A cellist, she studied at the Royal Academy of Music. In addition to playing cello with a number of different ensembles, she is also a practicing music therapist.

References

Living people
British experimental musicians
British cellists
Music therapists
Alumni of the Royal Academy of Music
Women cellists
Year of birth missing (living people)
Penguin Cafe Orchestra members